Two You Four You is Tackey & Tsubasa's 2nd album to be released under avex trax. The album was released on November 15, 2006, over two and a half years after their debut album "2wenty 2wo", and contains a total of four previously released singles.

Overview
Two You Four You is the second original studio album released by duo Tackey & Tsubasa. The album contains four singles: Serenade, Kamen/Mirai Koukai, Venus, and Ho! Summer (Mirai Koukai was not included on the album for unknown reasons). In all, the regular album contained a total of 16 songs, while the limited and CD+DVD only contained 15 songs.

The regular version of the album comes with a bonus track as with most of their singles. The limited pressing of the album comes with a bonus CD that will contain karaoke versions of most of the album's songs, along with a sticker. The DVD version of the album comes with a DVD containing backstage and concert footage from their "Takitsuba Izumo Concert" and behind-the-scenes footage for "Venus" and "Ho! Summer".

The title of the album is a play on the fact that both singers are 24 years old.

Track listing

Regular CD Format - Jacket C
 "" (Akio Shimizu) — 4:24
 "Venus" (Hitoshi Haneda) — 4:08
 ": Album version" (Hitoshi Haneda) — 3:50
 "" (Susumu Kawaguchi, Makoto Atoji) — 5:16
 "Black Butterfly" (Bounceback, Paul Rein, Daniel Eklund) — 3:27
 "Slave of Love" (Kenn Kato, Face 2 Fake) — 3:56
 "Mermaid" (Kouji Ite, Makoto Sakuma) — 4:36
 "" (Hideyuki Obata, Mikio Sakai) — 5:07
 "Rainy Memories" (Makoto Seiden, Susumu Kawaguchi) — 3:43
 "" (Makoto Koshinaka, LaVenDer) — 4:47
 "" (Hitoshi Haba) — 4:58
 "Hey!! Listen to the Music" (Kenn Kato, Hiroshi Hibino) — 4:13
 "" (Kousuke Morimoto) — 4:40
 "Venus: Eurobeat Remix" (Remix: Dave Rodgers) — 4:48
 ": Christmas Version" (Hitoshi Haneda) — 4:53
 "" (Hitoshi Haneda) — 4:18

Limited CD Format - Jacket B

Disc 1
 "" (Akio Shimizu) — 4:24
 "Venus" (Hitoshi Haneda) — 4:08
 ": Album version" (Hitoshi Haneda) — 3:50
 "" (Susumu Kawaguchi, Makoto Atoji) — 5:16
 "Black Butterfly" (Bounceback, Paul Rein, Daniel Eklund) — 3:27
 "Slave of Love" (Kenn Kato, Face 2 Fake) — 3:56
 "Mermaid" (Kouji Ite, Makoto Sakuma) — 4:36
 "" (Hideyuki Obata, Mikio Sakai) — 5:07
 "Rainy Memories" (Makoto Seiden, Susumu Kawaguchi) — 3:43
 "" (Makoto Koshinaka, LaVenDer) — 4:47
 "" (Hitoshi Haba) — 4:58
 "Hey!! Listen to the Music" (Kenn Kato, Hiroshi Hibino) — 4:13
 "" (Kousuke Morimoto) — 4:40
 "Venus: Eurobeat Remix" (Remix: Dave Rodgers) — 4:48
 ": Christmas Version" (Hitoshi Haneda) — 4:53

Disc 2
 ": karaoke"
 "Venus: karaoke"
 ":Album version: karaoke"
 ": karaoke"
 "Slave of Love: karaoke"
 "Mermaid: karaoke"
 ": karaoke"
 ": karaoke"
 ": karaoke"
 "Hey!! Listen to the Music: karaoke"
 ": karaoke"
 ": karaoke"
 "Special Radio Show 1"
 "Special Radio Show 2"

CD+DVD Format - Jacket A

CD Portion
 "" (Akio Shimizu) — 4:24
 "Venus" (Hitoshi Haneda) — 4:08
 ": Album version" (Hitoshi Haneda) — 3:50
 "" (Susumu Kawaguchi, Makoto Atoji) — 5:16
 "Black Butterfly" (Bounceback, Paul Rein, Daniel Eklund) — 3:27
 "Slave of Love" (Kenn Kato, Face 2 Fake) — 3:56
 "Mermaid" (Kouji Ite, Makoto Sakuma) — 4:36
 "" (Hideyuki Obata, Mikio Sakai) — 5:07
 "Rainy Memories" (Makoto Seiden, Susumu Kawaguchi) — 3:43
 "" (Makoto Koshinaka, LaVenDer) — 4:47
 "" (Hitoshi Haba) — 4:58
 "Hey!! Listen to the Music" (Kenn Kato, Hiroshi Hibino) — 4:13
 "" (Kousuke Morimoto) — 4:40
 "Venus: Eurobeat Remix" (Remix: Dave Rodgers) — 4:48
 ": Christmas Version" (Hitoshi Haneda) — 4:53

DVD Portion
 "滝翼出雲魂咲会跳 (Off-Shot & Concert)"
 "Venus (Off-Shot)"
 "Ho! サマー (Off-Shot)"

Production
 Art Direction & Design - White Phat Graphics
 Photograph - Tomojiro Kamiya
 Styling - Akiko Yanagita
 Hair & Make up - Yoshimi Michinaka
 Creative Direction - Masahiro Ujie
 Creative Coordinate - Hayato Mori
 Location Coordinate - Mariana Resort

Charts
Album - Oricon Sales Chart (Japan)

Singles - Oricon Sales Chart (Japan)

RIAJ Certification
As of December 2006, "Two You Four You" has been certified gold for shipments of over 100,000 by the RIAJ.

References
 

2006 albums
Tackey & Tsubasa albums